Montfort is a village in Grant and Iowa Counties in the U.S. state of Wisconsin. The population was 718 at the 2010 census. Of this, 622 were in Grant County, and 96 were in Iowa County.

The Iowa County portion of Montfort is part of the Madison Metropolitan Statistical Area, while the Grant County portion is part of the Platteville Micropolitan Statistical Area.

History

Montfort was named from an old fort situated on a nearby hill.  The site of the village was inhabited and operated as an unincorporated settlement in the town of Wingville, Wisconsin, since 1848.  It was formally incorporated as a village in 1893.

The Wisconsin Farmers Union Specialty Cheese Company in Montfort produces the award-winning Montforte Blue Cheese.

Geography
Montfort is located at  (42.971399, -90.432937).  It is bounded on the west, north, and south, by the town of Wingville, Wisconsin, and is bounded on the east by the town of Highland, Iowa County, Wisconsin.

Demographics

2010 census
As of the census of 2010, there were 718 people, 279 households, and 192 families living in the village. The racial makeup of the village was 98.6% White, 0.8% African American, and 0.6% from other races. Hispanic or Latino of any race were 1.3% of the population.

There were 279 households, of which 34.1% had children under the age of 18 living with them, 53.8% were married couples living together, 10.0% had a female householder with no husband present, 5.0% had a male householder with no wife present, and 31.2% were non-families. 22.2% of all households were made up of individuals, and 10% had someone living alone who was 65 years of age or older. The average household size was 2.56 and the average family size was 2.98.

The median age in the village was 35.9 years. 24.8% of residents were under the age of 18; 10.5% were between the ages of 18 and 24; 24.5% were from 25 to 44; 28.3% were from 45 to 64; and 11.8% were 65 years of age or older. The gender makeup of the village was 50.6% male and 49.4% female.

2000 census
At the 2000 census, there were 663 people, 252 households and 179 families living in the village. The population density was 1,252.1 per square mile (483.0/km2). There were 273 housing units at an average density of 515.6 per square mile (198.9/km2). The racial makeup of the village was 99.25% White, 0.15% African American, and 0.60% from two or more races.

There were 252 households, of which 37.7% had children under the age of 18 living with them, 55.2% were married couples living together, 11.5% had a female householder with no husband present, and 28.6% were non-families. 23.0% of all households were individuals, and 13.5% had someone living alone who was 65 years of age or older. The average household size was 2.63 and the average family size was 3.12.

In terms of age distribution, 30.3% were under the age of 18, 8.3% from 18 to 24, 26.2% from 25 to 44, 20.5% from 45 to 64, and 14.6% were 65 years of age or older. The median age was 36 years. For every 100 females, there were 95.6 males. For every 100 females age 18 and over, there were 87.0 males.

The median income for a household in the village was $37,500, and the median income for a family was $43,295. Males had a median income of $28,125 versus $21,442 for females. The per capita income for the village was $16,126. About 1.7% of families and 5.7% of the population were below the poverty line, including 4.7% of those under age 18 and 7.1% of those age 65 or over.

References

External links

Information about Montfort, Wisconsin
 Sanborn fire insurance maps: 1899 1905 1914

Villages in Wisconsin
Villages in Grant County, Wisconsin
Villages in Iowa County, Wisconsin
Madison, Wisconsin, metropolitan statistical area